Work That Body may refer to:
"Work That Body", a 1979 song by Taana Gardner
"Work That Body", a song by Diana Ross from her 1981 album Why Do Fools Fall in Love
"Work That Body", a song by Beni Arashiro from her single "Cherish"	
"Work That Body", an unreleased song by Michael Jackson that was recorded during the sessions for his 1991 album Dangerous that was subsequently leaked.
Work That Body!, a book and video by exercise teacher Jackie Genova